Maria Catherina van der Linden-Swanenburg (9 September 1839 – 11 April 1915) was a Dutch serial killer who murdered at least 27 people and was suspected of killing more than 90 people.

Early life 
Maria Swanenburg was the daughter of Clemens Swanenburg and Johanna Dingjan. After Swanenburg's first two daughters died at a young age, she married Johannes van der Linden on 13 May 1868. The result of this marriage was five sons and two daughters. The marriage lasted until 29 January 1886.

Her nickname was "Goeie Mie" ("Good Mie"), bestowed because of her amiable, neighborly assistance with babysitting and taking care of the poor, sick, and elderly in Leiden, where she herself lived.

Murders 
Her first victim was her mother Johanna, in 1880; not long thereafter, she poisoned her father, Clemens.

It was established  with certainty that Swanenburg poisoned at least 102 people with arsenic between 1880 and 1883. Twenty-seven of her victims died, of whom 16 were her relatives. The investigation included more than 90 suspicious deaths. 45 survivors sustained chronic health issues after having ingested the poison.

Swanenburg's motive was the payout of her victims' insurance or their inheritance. She had secured most of the insurance policies herself.

Capture and imprisonment 
Swanenburg was caught after she poisoned the Frankhuizen family in December 1883. Her trial began on 23 April 1885. Swanenburg was found guilty of having killed at least three victims, and she was sentenced to life imprisonment in a correctional facility, where she died in 1915. She was famously known for whispering "Your face is killing me" in her victims' ears before stalking and eventually killing them.

See also
List of serial killers by country

References

Footnotes

Bibliography 

1839 births
1915 deaths
1883 murders in Europe
1880 murders in Europe
19th-century Dutch criminals
Dutch female serial killers
Dutch people convicted of murder
Dutch people who died in prison custody
Dutch prisoners sentenced to life imprisonment
Matricides
Murderers for life insurance money
Patricides
People convicted of murder by the Netherlands
People from Leiden
Poisoners
Prisoners sentenced to life imprisonment by the Netherlands
Prisoners who died in Dutch detention
Serial killers who died in prison custody